Marjolein Hillegonda Monica Faber-van de Klashorst (born 16 June 1960) is a Dutch politician; she has been a member of the Senate for the Party for Freedom since 7 June 2011 and the States of Gelderland since 10 March 2011. Previously she worked in hospitals and in IT. She has been party leader in the Senate since 10 June 2014, replacing Marcel de Graaff.

Faber-van de Klashorst worked in the Lichtenberg hospital in Amersfoort between 1978 and 1986. Between 1986 and 2011 she worked as a software engineer and IT specialist at various companies.

Campaigning for the 2019 Dutch provincial elections she argued for tax relief, and opposed "softer" political topics as multiculturalism. Reacting to a stabbing incident in Groningen in 2019 she claimed the perpetrator had a North-African skin colour, despite the victims stating it was a white man she remained with her version.

References

1960 births
21st-century Dutch politicians
Living people
Members of the Provincial Council of Gelderland
Members of the Senate (Netherlands)
Party for Freedom politicians
People from Amersfoort